The Welsh Rugby Union Division Two North (also called the SWALEC Division Two North for sponsorship reasons) is a rugby union league in Wales. The league was known as Division Five North before the 2008-09 season.

Competition format and sponsorship

Competition
There are 12 clubs in the WRU Division Two North. During the course of a season (which lasts from September to May) each club plays the others twice, once at their home ground and once at that of their opponents for a total of 18 games for each club, with a total of 90 games in each season. Teams receive four points for a win and two point for a draw, an additional bonus point is awarded to either team if they score four tries or more in a single match. No points are awarded for a loss though the losing team can gain a bonus point for finishing the match within seven points of the winning team. Teams are ranked by total points, then the number of tries scored and then points difference. At the end of each season, the club with the most points is crowned as champion. If points are equal the tries scored then points difference determines the winner. The team who is declared champion at the end of the season is eligible for promotion to WRU Division One North.

Sponsorship 
In 2008 the Welsh Rugby Union announced a new sponsorship deal for the club rugby leagues with SWALEC valued at £1 million (GBP). The initial three year sponsorship was extended at the end of the 2010/11 season, making SWALEC the league sponsors until 2015. The leagues sponsored are the WRU Divisions one through to seven.

 (2002-2005) Lloyds TSB
 (2005-2008) Asda
 (2008-2015) SWALEC

2021/22 Season

Current League teams

 Abergele RFC
 Bangor RFC
 Colwyn Bay RFC
 Mold RFC
 Nant Conwy 2nd XV
 Newtown RFC
 Rhyl and District RFC
 Shotton Steel RFC
 Welshpool RFC
 Wrexham RFC

2011/2012 Season

League teams

 Abergele RFC
 COBRA
 Colwyn Bay RFC
 Denbigh RFC
 Dolgellau RFC
 Llanidloes RFC
 Machynlleth RFC
 Newtown RFC
 Rhyl and District RFC
 Wrexham RFC

2011/2012 Table

2010/2011 Season

League teams

 Abergele RFC
 Bala RFC
 Bangor RFC
 COBRA
 Denbigh RFC
 Dolgellau RFC
 Llanidloes RFC
 Machynlleth RFC
 Newtown RFC
 Rhyl and District RFC
 Welshpool RFC
 Wrexham RFC

2011/2012 Table

2009/2010 Season

League teams

WRU Division Two North (North)
 Bala RFC
 Bangor RFC
 Bethesda RFC
 Rhosllanerchrugog RFC
 Rhyl and District RFC
 Wrexham RFC

WRU Division Two North (South)
 Caereinion OBRA
 Dolgellau RFC
 Llanidloes RFC
 Machynlleth RFC
 Newtown RFC
 Welshpool RFC

2008/2009 Season

League teams 
 Bangor RFC
 Bethesda RFC
 Bro Ffestiniog RFC
 Caereinion OBRA
 Llanidloes RFC
 Machynlleth RFC
 Newtown RFC
 Rhosllanerchrugog RFC
 Rhyl and District RFC
 Welshpool RFC
 Wrexham RFC

League table

2007/2008 Season

League teams 
 Bangor RFC
 Bethesda RFC
 Bro Ffestiniog RFC
 Caereinion OBRA
 Machynlleth RFC
 Pwllheli RFC
 Rhayader RFC
 Rhosllanerchrugog RFC
 Rhyl and District RFC
 Welshpool RFC
 Wrexham RFC

League table

'*'Early in the 2007/08 season Bangor RFC withdrew from the league in an attempt to restructure the club.

References

4